This article summarizes the outcomes of all official matches played by the Belgium national football team by opponent and by decade, since they first played in official competitions in 1904.

Record per opponent

The following table shows Belgium's all-time international record per opponent. It excludes any unofficial matches.

Note: countries considered as a continuity by the FIFA are put in italics. Their statistics are in fact composed of multiple countries that are also included separately.

Results in chronological order
The summarizing tables below show Belgium's official matches per decade. More extensive reports (with dates, scores, goal scorers and match circumstances) can be found on the main articles per decade. This detailed information is currently available only for the 1900s, 1910s, and 1980s onward.

1904–1919

47 matches played:

1920–1929

61 matches played:

1930–1939

70 matches played:

1940–1949

29 matches played:

1950–1959

70 matches played:

1960–1969

68 matches played:

1970–1979

57 matches played:

1980–1989

84 matches played:

1990–1999

89 matches played:

2000–2009

98 matches played:

2010–2019

111 matches played:

2020–2029 

37 matches played (as of 1 December 2022):

Notes

References

Belgium national results in chronological order, and head-to-head record against all countries – RSSSF
The Red Devils Archive